Düvier is a village and a former municipality in the Vorpommern-Greifswald district, in Mecklenburg-Vorpommern, Germany. Since 1 July 2012, it is part of the town Loitz.

Its name originates from a French Huguenot family that immigrated from Lyon at the end of the 17th century.

References

Former municipalities in Mecklenburg-Western Pomerania